The Chicken is a 1965 French short comedy film directed by Claude Berri. It won an Oscar in 1966 for Best Short Subject.

Cast
 Jacques Marin
 Viviane Bourdonneux
 Martin Serre

Reception
John Simon described The Chicken as 'crude'.

References

External links

1965 films
1965 comedy films
1965 short films
1960s French-language films
Live Action Short Film Academy Award winners
French black-and-white films
Films directed by Claude Berri
Films produced by Claude Berri
French comedy short films
1960s French films